Marieme Jamme (born 1974) is a Senegalese-born French-British businesswoman and technology activist. In 2016 she founded the iamtheCODE initiative and is on the board of the World Wide Web Foundation. In 2017, Quartz Africa included Jamme in their "Quartz Africa Innovators 2017" list. In 2013 she was nominated as a Young Global Leader of the World Economic Forum. In 2017, she won the "Innovation Award" in The Goalkeepers Global Goal Awards, curated by UNICEF and the Bill & Melinda Gates Foundation, for globally supporting girls and young women and advancing the UN's Sustainable Development Goals. That same year, she was listed as one of BBC's 100 Women.

Early life 
There have been conflicting accounts from Jamme with regards to her early life. In early interviews, including with CNN in 2012, she stated that she had a turbulent childhood and was born in Senegal to privileged parents with her mother being an aristocrat, and after the death of her father in 1992 moved to France, where she worked in restaurants and cleaning jobs to fund her studies in marketing and communication. In a 2014 interview with Radio France Internationale, Jamme discussed coming from a wealthy family living comfortably in Dakar before moving to France, where she worked a number of odd jobs to independently finance her Master's in Marketing and Communication. According to the same interview, she then moved to the UK to improve her English, and obtained an MBA at the University of Surrey, before being hired by Citibank and then by JP Morgan and Lloyds Bank, before spending time in management at software manufacturers Oracle and Microsoft.

In other publications, Jamme has stated that she experienced considerable hardship during her childhood; she was abandoned by her mother, did not receive a formal education, and at age 11 was raped by her Quranic teacher in Senegal. She has also said that at age 13, she was trafficked to France, where she spent time homeless and in prostitution, with some interviews saying that at age 16 she was taken by the police to a refugee camp, and at 18  moved to the United Kingdom. Other reports say she moved to the UK at 16, and there she began to educate herself and taught herself computer programming. During a 2019 interview with O Globo in Brazil, Jamme said that she was abandoned by her mother at age 6 and moved to Guildford, Surrey, UK at age 16, where she taught herself to read and write in a local library and worked as a cleaner.

In a 2019 interview, Italian newspaper La Repubblica raised these discrepancies; however, Jamme terminated the interview and did not comment. La Repubblica commented that she had a personal history that is "as romantic as it is dubious".

Career

Jamme is the founder and CEO of SpotOne Global Solutions, which is based in the UK and was established in 2007 in order to help IT organizations establish in Europe, the Middle East, Africa and Asia. She is the co-founder of Africa Gathering, the first global platform for entrepreneurs and experts to network with regards to development across Africa. Jamme was referred to as being "at the forefront of the technology revolution that is slowly transforming Africa" by CNN. She has been involved in various competitions for tech innovation including the annual "Apps4Africa" competition as an organiser and judge, showcasing innovation and app ideas across the continent of Africa, and the Royal Academy of Engineering Africa prize for Innovation.

In 2013, Jamme was honoured as a Young Global Leader by the World Economic Forum for her activism work in empowering and investing in young girls and women in Africa, the Middle East, and Asia through creative learning, entrepreneurship, science, technology, engineering, art, mathematics, and design (STEAMD). In 2015, Jamme collaborated with a group of African leaders to create "Accur8Africa", an initiative to help governments, civil society, entrepreneurs, and businesses evaluate progress on the UN's Sustainable Development Goals by 2030 using Accurate Data.

iamtheCODE 

2017 saw the launch of Jamme's "iamtheCODE" initiative, which became the first African-led initiative that collaborated with government, private sector, and investors to advance STEAMD education for girls from under-privileged areas in Africa, South America and the Middle East. The program's goal is to contribute in achieving the UN sustainability goals for education by reaching 1 million girls by 2030. The program aims to inspire more girls worldwide to learn to code, with an emphasis on including marginalised communities by providing them with educational spaces, tools and employment guidance.

World Wide Web Foundation board and awards 
In 2017 Jamme became the first black woman on the board of the World Wide Web Foundation. That same year, she was recognised as one of five inspiring leaders at the Goalkeepers Global Goals Awards, which were hosted by U.N. Deputy Secretary-General Amina J. Mohammed and Melinda Gates, where she won the Innovation award.

Jamme has been included in the 2019 and 2020 editions of the Powerlist, a listing of the 100 most influential people in the UK of African/African-Caribbean descent.

References

Senegalese businesspeople
Senegalese women in business
Senegalese bloggers
Chief executives in the technology industry
Social entrepreneurs
BBC 100 Women
Senegalese women bloggers
1974 births
Living people